Malik Tazi Bhat (مالک تازی بٹ) was a Kashmiri warlord, from 1475 to 1487, who ruled Jammu, Poonch, Rajouri, Bhimber, Jhelum and the Sialkot/Gujrat region.

Biography
Malik Tazi Bhat was born in a noble Kashmiri Muslim  family which served the Shah Mir Dynasty of Kashmir.

Military conquest
Rise to Power

In 1475, Malik Tazi Butt gained hereditary power as a warlord of the Jammu Region, He then wages war against the Sayyid nobles in the region, decreasing their power. After increasing his popularity among the locals of Kashmir and Punjab, he unites the regions of Jammu, Poonch, Rajouri, and Bhimber.

War against Lodhi Sultanate

After unifying the regions from Poonch to Jammu, he called war against Bahlol Lodhi in c.a 1479. The Lodhi governor of Lahore Tatar Khan then prepares his forces near Sialkot. Tatar Khan then suffers a major loss, as Sialkot is ceded to Tazi's rule in c.a 1480. Tazi then later expands his power from Sialkot to Jhelum. Malik Tazi Bhat then marches towards Lahore, but is stopped by Tatar Khan forces near Lahore. Tazi Bhat still continued the war against the Lodhi Dynasty until his death in c.a 1487.

Personal life
Malik Tazi Bhat, was known as an Orthodox Muslim. Though he opposed the Sayyid Nobility, he married a noble Sayyid girl, from which he had two sons.

Death
He died in Sialkot, Punjab Region, in 1487.

References

15th-century births
1487 deaths
Warlords